Ivanovka is a rural locality (a village) in Gorod Vyazniki, Vyaznikovsky District, Vladimir Oblast, Russia. The population was 7 as of 2010.

Geography 
Ivanovka is located 4 km north of Vyazniki (the district's administrative centre) by road. Zolotaya Griva is the nearest rural locality.

References 

Rural localities in Vyaznikovsky District